The Medford IOOF Cemetery in Medford, Oregon, also known as Medford Odd Fellows Cemetery and as Eastwood–IOOF Cemetery, was founded in 1890.  The cemetery was managed by the IOOF Lodge until 1969 where maintenance was transferred to the City of Medford, where it remains today.

The cemetery was added to the National Register of Historic Places in 1989, for its architecture, which includes Late 19th and 20th Century Revivals architecture, Art Deco architecture, and Modernistic architecture.   The  site includes a contributing building, a contributing site, and a contributing structure.

Its NRHP nomination asserts that "the cemetery's collection of grave markers effectively represents 19th century mortuary art."

The cemetery includes a mausoleum built in 1925 and expanded in 1947. The 1947 expansion covered the front facade, eliminating a columned portico and preserving the stained glass window. The original bronze doors were reinstalled into the new facade. US Representative Edwin Durno (1899–1976) is interred there.

References

External links
 
 

Cemeteries in Oregon
National Register of Historic Places in Jackson County, Oregon
Medford, Oregon
Protected areas of Jackson County, Oregon
1890 establishments in Oregon
Historic districts on the National Register of Historic Places in Oregon
Odd Fellows cemeteries in the United States